Merchang (est. pop. (2000 census): 3,170) is a town located in a sub-district of the same name in Marang District, Terengganu, Malaysia. Fishery (including oyster cultivation) and agriculture are the main economic activities in Merchang, Marang, Terengganu.

History 

Merchang was considered a district from 13 states of Terengganu. This was divided by Sultan Abidin II who ruled from the year 1881 until 1919. Sultan Abidin II already appointed Tengku Long when he at around Singapore for guard Merchang district meanwhile he depute to 2 husbands which is Tengku Long and Tengku Safiah. The main yield of Merchang district at that time was entrepreneur of "belacan" and dried fish that would sending to Singapore.

References 

Towns in Terengganu